KYSC (96.9 FM) is a commercial classic rock music radio station in Fairbanks, Alaska.

KYSC was the commercial flagship station of University of Alaska Nanooks hockey before losing their rights to KSUA prior to the start of the 2008–2009 season.

External links

Classic rock radio stations in the United States
YSC
Radio stations established in 2003
2003 establishments in Alaska